Talachyn District is a district (raion) in Vitebsk Region, Belarus.

References

 
Districts of Vitebsk Region